Gabriel Diego Fernández (born October 23, 1976) is a former Argentine-Italian professional basketball player.

Professional career
In his pro career, Fernández played with numerous clubs, including Boca Juniors in the Argentine league.

National team career
As a member of Argentina's junior national teams, Fernández played at the 1995 FIBA Under-19 World Cup, and the 1997 FIBA Under-21 World Cup.

As a member of the senior men's Argentine national team, he played at the following tournaments: the 1995 FIBA South American Championship, the 1997 FIBA South American Championship, the 1997 FIBA AmeriCup, the 1998 FIBA World Cup, the 1999 Pan American Games, the 1999 FIBA AmeriCup (bronze medal), the 2001 FIBA South American Championship (gold medal), the 2001 FIBA AmeriCup (gold medal), the 2002 FIBA World Cup (silver medal), the 2003 FIBA South American Championship (gold medal), the 2003 FIBA AmeriCup (silver medal), and the 2005 FIBA AmeriCup (silver medal).

He was also a member of Argentina's 2004 Summer Olympic Games gold medal winning team.

Awards and honors

Pro clubs
Pan American Club Championship Champion: (2000)
South American League Champion: (2001)
Argentine League All-Star Game: (2001)
2× Argentine League Champion: (2001, 2014)
Spanish Cup Winner: (2002)
Spanish League Champion: (2002)

Argentine national team
1995 FIBA South American Championship: 
1997 FIBA South American Championship: 
1999 FIBA AmeriCup: 
2001 FIBA South American Championship: 
2001 FIBA AmeriCup: 
2002 FIBA World Cup: 
2003 FIBA South American Championship: 
2003 FIBA AmeriCup: 
2004 Summer Olympics: 
2005 FIBA AmeriCup:

External links
FIBA Profile
Euroleague.net Profile
Spanish League Profile 
Italian League Profile 
Latinbasket.com Profile

1976 births
Living people
2006 FIBA World Championship players
Argentine expatriate basketball people in Spain
Argentine men's basketball players
Basketball players at the 1999 Pan American Games
Basketball players at the 2004 Summer Olympics
Boca Juniors basketball players
CB Valladolid players
Centers (basketball)
Estudiantes de Olavarría basketball players
Ferro Carril Oeste basketball players
Italian expatriate basketball people in Spain
Italian men's basketball players
Lanús basketball players
Liga ACB players
Marinos B.B.C. players
Medalists at the 2004 Summer Olympics
Obras Sanitarias basketball players
Olympic basketball players of Argentina
Olympic gold medalists for Argentina
Olympic medalists in basketball
Pallacanestro Varese players
Peñarol de Mar del Plata basketball players
People from Lomas de Zamora
Power forwards (basketball)
Saski Baskonia players
Sportspeople from Buenos Aires Province
STB Le Havre players
Pan American Games competitors for Argentina